Boroneddu is a comune (municipality) in the Province of Oristano in the Italian region Sardinia, located about  north of Cagliari and about  northeast of Oristano.

Boroneddu borders the following municipalities: Ghilarza, Soddì, Tadasuni.

Demographic evolution

References

Cities and towns in Sardinia